William H. Malone (1868 – May 10, 1917) was an American pre-Negro league pitcher in the late 1800s.

A native of Detroit, Michigan, Malone began his professional career with the Philadelphia Pythians in 1887. In 1890, he posted a 13–5 record with a 2.74 ERA for the York Monarchs. Malone died in Saginaw, Michigan in 1917 at age 48 or 49.

References

External links
  and Seamheads

1868 births
1917 deaths
Cuban Giants players
New York Gorhams players
20th-century African-American people
Baseball pitchers